Live at the BBC is a live album by the Dutch progressive rock group Focus, recorded on 21 March 1976, and broadcast on Radio 1 in the BBC Concert Series, but released only in 2004 by Hux Records, in CD format.

The album was recorded just weeks after Jan Akkerman had left the band, and a new guitarist, Philip Catherine had been brought in. According to the Allmusic review, "although the sound quality is very good, the music doesn’t only suffer from Akkerman's absence; it’s also about half- boring, laid-back, instrumental jazz-funk fusion."

Track listing

Personnel
Focus
Thijs van Leer – keyboards, flute, vocals
Philip Catherine – guitar
Bert Ruiter – bass
David Kemper – drums

References

Focus (band) albums
1976 live albums
2004 live albums
Hux Records albums
BBC Radio recordings